Triumfetta is a genus of plants in the family Malvaceae. Burbark is a common name for plants in this genus.

The genus was originally described and published by Carl Linnaeus in his book Sp. Pl. on page 444 in 1753.

There are about 176 species which are widespread across tropical regions.

Species
These include:

Triumfetta abutiloides 
Triumfetta acahuizotlanensis 
Triumfetta acracantha 
Triumfetta actinocarpa 
Triumfetta albida (Domin) Halford
Triumfetta althaeoides 
Triumfetta amuletum 
Triumfetta angolensis 
Triumfetta annua 
Triumfetta antrorsa Halford 
Triumfetta antunesii 
Triumfetta appendiculata F.Muell.
Triumfetta aquila Halford 
Triumfetta arborescens 
Triumfetta arnhemica 
Triumfetta aspera Halford  
Triumfetta attenuata 
Triumfetta barbosa  Lay
Triumfetta benguelensis 
Triumfetta benguetensis 
Triumfetta bicornuta 
Triumfetta bogotensis 
Triumfetta brachistacantha 
Triumfetta brachyceras 
Triumfetta bradshawii F.Muell.
Triumfetta breviaculeata Halford
Triumfetta brevipes 
Triumfetta calycina 
Triumfetta calzadae 
Triumfetta cana 
Triumfetta carteri Halford 
Triumfetta caudata 
Triumfetta centralis Halford 
Triumfetta chaetocarpa F.Muell.
Triumfetta chihuahuensis 
Triumfetta cinerea 
Triumfetta cladara Halford 
Triumfetta clementii (Domin) Rye 
Triumfetta clivorum Halford  
Triumfetta cordifolia A. Rich.
Triumfetta coriacea 
Triumfetta coronata Halford 
Triumfetta cucullata 
Triumfetta dekindtiana 
Triumfetta delicatula 
Triumfetta denticulata R.Br. ex Benth.
Triumfetta deserticola Halford 
Triumfetta digitata 
Triumfetta dilungensis 
Triumfetta dioica 
Triumfetta discolor 
Triumfetta echinata Halford
Triumfetta eriophlebia 
Triumfetta falcifera 
Triumfetta ferruginea 
Triumfetta fissurata Halford 
Triumfetta flavescens 
Triumfetta galeottiana 
Triumfetta geoides 
Triumfetta glabra 
Triumfetta glabrior 
Triumfetta glaucescens Benth.
Triumfetta glechomoides 
Triumfetta goldmanii 
Triumfetta gonophora 
Triumfetta gossweileri 
Triumfetta grandidens 
Triumfetta grandiflora 
Triumfetta grandistipulata 
Triumfetta graveolens 
Triumfetta guaranitica 
Triumfetta guazumicarpa 
Triumfetta guerrerensis 
Triumfetta hapala Halford 
Triumfetta heliocarpoides 
Triumfetta heptaphylla 
Triumfetta heterocarpa 
Triumfetta heudelotii 
Triumfetta hundtii 
Triumfetta incana Halford 
Triumfetta indurata 
Triumfetta inermis 
Triumfetta jaegeri 
Triumfetta japonica 
Triumfetta johnstonii 
Triumfetta katangensis 
Triumfetta keniensis 
Triumfetta kenneallyi Halford
Triumfetta kirkii 
Triumfetta kochii 
Triumfetta kundelungensis 
Triumfetta lappula L.
Triumfetta lebrunii 
Triumfetta lepidota 
Triumfetta leptacantha F.Muell.
Triumfetta likasiensis 
Triumfetta litticola 
Triumfetta longicoma 
Triumfetta longicornuta 
Triumfetta longipedunculata Halford 
Triumfetta maconochieana Halford
Triumfetta macrocoma 
Triumfetta malebarica 
Triumfetta marsupiata 
Triumfetta martinezalfaroi 
Triumfetta marunguensis 
Triumfetta matudae 
Triumfetta medusae 
Triumfetta mellina Halford  
Triumfetta mexiae 
Triumfetta micracantha F.Muell.
Triumfetta mitchellii Halford
Triumfetta mollissima 
Triumfetta monstrosa Halford 
Triumfetta multiglandulosa 
Triumfetta novogaliciana 
Triumfetta nutans Halford 
Triumfetta obliqua 
Triumfetta obtusicornis 
Triumfetta oenpelliensis 
Triumfetta oligacantha 
Triumfetta orthacantha 
Triumfetta paniculata 
Triumfetta pannosa 
Triumfetta paradoxa 
Triumfetta parviflora Benth.
Triumfetta pedunculata 
Triumfetta pentandra A.Rich. 
Triumfetta persimilis 
Triumfetta pilosa Roth
Triumfetta plumigera F.Muell. 
Triumfetta polyandra 
Triumfetta procumbens G. Forst.
Triumfetta propinqua Halford
Triumfetta prostrata 
Triumfetta purpusii 
Triumfetta pustulata Halford 
Triumfetta ramosa Sprague & Hutch
Triumfetta reflexa W.Fitzg.
Triumfetta repens (Blume) Merr. & Rolfe 
Triumfetta reticulata 
Triumfetta rhodoneura 
Triumfetta rhomboidea Jacq. 
Triumfetta rotundifolia 
Triumfetta rubiginosa Halford
Triumfetta rupestris Halford 
Triumfetta ryeae Halford 
Triumfetta saccata Halford   
Triumfetta sampaioi 
Triumfetta scandens 
Triumfetta semitriloba Jacq.
Triumfetta sericata 
Triumfetta setulosa 
Triumfetta shinyangensis 
Triumfetta simplicifolia 
Triumfetta simulans Halford  
Triumfetta socorrensis 
Triumfetta sonderi Ficalho & Hiern
Triumfetta speciosa 
Triumfetta stellata 
Triumfetta suffruticosa Blume
Triumfetta sylvicola 
Triumfetta tenuipedunculata 
Triumfetta tenuiseta Halford 
Triumfetta tomentosa 
Triumfetta trachystema 
Triumfetta triandra Sprague & Hutch.
Triumfetta trichocarpa Hochst. ex A. Rich. 
Triumfetta trifida 
Triumfetta trigona 
Triumfetta trisecta Halford  
Triumfetta villosiuscula 
Triumfetta viridis 
Triumfetta welwitschii 
Triumfetta winneckeana F.Muell.
Triumfetta youngii

References

Grewioideae
Malvaceae genera
Taxa named by Carl Linnaeus
Flora of West Tropical Africa
Flora of West-Central Tropical Africa
Flora of Northeast Tropical Africa
Flora of East Tropical Africa
Flora of South Tropical Africa
Flora of Southern Africa
Flora of the Arabian Peninsula
Flora of tropical Asia
Flora of Indo-China
Flora of Malesia
Flora of Papuasia
Flora of Mexico
Flora of Central America
Flora of the Caribbean
Flora of northern South America
Flora of western South America
Flora of Brazil